The Council of People's Commissars of Azerbaijan was established as the governing body of the Azerbaijan Soviet Socialist Republic. Accounts differ as to whether it was formed on 28 April 1920 (Mil'man and Guliev) or at the First All-Azerbaijan Congress of Soviets, 6-19 May (Kharmandarian). The 11th Red Army had  moved into north Azerbaijan following the defeat of General Anton Denikin's Volunteer Army. The  Baku Bureau of Kavkraikom (the Caucasian Regional Committee) of the Russian Communist Party (Bolshevik) had held a joint meeting with the Communist Party of Azerbaijan on 27 April at which they formed the Azerbaijan Revolutionary Committee (Azrevkom). This new body issued an ultimatum to the government of the Azerbaijan Democratic Republic, who immediately surrendered: The Red Army had sent an armoured train directly to Baku which arrived on 28 April. The terms of the surrender passed lawful power to Azrevkom, to whom several key figures had been appointed in their absence. In particular Nariman Narimanov was absent having travelled to Moscow to see Lenin and Stalin and only arrived in Baku on 16 May. Thus although he was declared the chairperson of the AzSovnarkom, this was a role he could only truly assume when he arrived in the middle of the First All-Azerbaijan Congress of Soviets. The senior Bolsheviks responsible for stage managing the foundation of the AzSovnarkom were Sergei Kirov and Grigoriy Ordzhonikidze.

Original membership of AzSovnarkom

Established 28 April 1920:
 Nariman Narimanov Chairman of the Council of People's Commissars
 Chingiz Ildyrym, People's Commissar of Naval Affairs
 Hamid Sultanov, People's Commissar of Internal Affairs 
 Aliheydar Garayev, People's Commissar of Labor and Justice
 Gazanfar Musabekov, People's Commissar of Agriculture, Commerce, Industry and Food
 Mirza Davud Huseynov, People's Commissar of Finance
 Samad aga Agamalioglu
 Dadash Bunyadzade, People's Commissar of Education and State Control
 Cemil bey Vezirov, People's Commissar of Posts, Telegraphs and Communications
 Ağahüseyn Kazımov People’s Commissar of Health

Later development

On 28 November 28,  Movsum Kadyrli was appointed People’s Commissar of Health of the AzSSR. He held this position until January 21, 1935.

References

1920s in Azerbaijan
Azerbaijan Soviet Socialist Republic